Scythris munroi is a moth of the family Scythrididae. It was described by Bengt Å. Bengtsson in 2014. It is found in North West province, South Africa.

References

Endemic moths of South Africa
mulanjensis
Moths described in 2014